Miedź Legnica II is a Polish football team, which serves as the reserve side of Miedź Legnica. They compete in the III liga, the fourth division of Polish football. The club participated in the Polish Cup in the 2016–17 season.

Polish Cup records

References

External links
 Miedź Legnica II at 90minut.pl 

 
Legnica
Reserve team football in Poland